Robin Hood and the Scotchman is Child ballad 130.

Synopsis

Robin Hood goes north and meets with a Scot, who wishes to enter his service.  Robin refuses, because the Scot will prove false.  A fight ensues.  One variant is truncated at this point, but the other ends with the man entering his service.

References

External links

)

Child Ballads
Robin Hood ballads